KickRaux is a Jamaican DJ, record producer, songwriter and music executive. He has collaborated with producers and vocalists such as Vybz Kartel, Major Lazer, Tyga, Wizkid, Machel Montano, Chronixx, Konshens, Busta Rhymes, Charly Black, Demarco and is known for his remixes of artists such as Migos, Jay Z, Mila J, Kranium & M.I.A. Major Lazer frontman Diplo referred to KickRaux as "one of (his) favorite new producers." In early 2014, KickRaux was credited with coining the term Future Dancehall, which refers to his style of music productions.

Early life 
KickRaux was born in Portmore, Jamaica and raised in Miami, Florida. His early remixes led to a feature on MTV UK's The Wrap Up. KickRaux replaced the name Rieces Pieces under which he produced his first remix of M.I.A. featuring Jay Z "XXXO'". In 2012 he produced several dancehall remixes which led to radio play on BBC Radio 1Xtra and other international radio stations across Russia, France, Canada, Australia and the Caribbean. In 2013, KickRaux went back to EDM bass music to collaborate and release EDM remixes which received positive reviews and support from a number or publications (MTV Hive, Spin Magazine, Vibe, Peace Magazine, Pigeons & Planes, The Frontliner) and DJs of the genre (Flosstradamus, Dj Carnage, Nick Catchdubs, Dirty South Joe and Swizzymack). This led to a US city tour which included sharing the stage with Krewella and Brillz. In 2013 he partnered with MTV for an Exclusive Guest Mix. He also partnered with MySpace for a front page release premiere

Later work

Production credits

References

External links
KickRaux Website

Living people

Year of birth missing (living people)

American record producers
Musicians from Florida